Coolamon railway station is located on the Hay line in New South Wales, Australia. It serves the town of Coolamon.

History
Coolamon station opened on 28 August 1881 as Gawabbie. It was renamed Cooleman on 1 September 1881, and finally Coolamon on 1 December 1895. Opposite the platform lies a passing loop.

Services
Coolamon is served by a twice weekly NSW TrainLink Xplorer between Griffith and  Sydney split from Canberrra services at Goulburn. NSW TrainLink also operate a road coach service from Wagga Wagga to Griffith via Coolamon.

References

External links

Coolamon station details Transport for New South Wales

John Whitton railway stations
Railway stations in Australia opened in 1881
Regional railway stations in New South Wales